Achziger is a surname. Notable people with the surname include:

Alexander Achziger (born 1953), Kazakhstani-German ice hockey coach
Harvey Achziger (born 1931), American businessman and football player